Zhu Minzhu (born 9 June 1962) is a Chinese fencer. She competed in the women's team foil event at the 1984 Summer Olympics.

References

1962 births
Living people
Chinese female fencers
Olympic fencers of China
Fencers at the 1984 Summer Olympics
20th-century Chinese women